Joan Verdú Sánchez (born 23 May 1995 in Andorra la Vella) is an alpine skier from Andorra. He debuted in 2010 and on 22 January 2012 he finished third at the French national championships, and finished third for Super-G at 2012 Winter Youth Olympics. He competed for Andorra at the 2014 Winter Olympics.

Notes

References

External links 
 
 
 

1995 births
Living people
Andorran male alpine skiers
Olympic alpine skiers of Andorra
Alpine skiers at the 2014 Winter Olympics
Alpine skiers at the 2018 Winter Olympics
Alpine skiers at the 2022 Winter Olympics
Alpine skiers at the 2012 Winter Youth Olympics